In enzymology, a (S)-canadine synthase is an enzyme that catalyzes the chemical reaction

(S)-tetrahydrocolumbamine + NADPH + H + O  (S)-canadine + NADP + 2 HO

The 4 substrates of this enzyme are (S)-tetrahydrocolumbamine, NADPH, H, and O, whereas its 3 products are Canadine, NADP, and HO.

This enzyme belongs to the family of oxidoreductases, specifically those acting on paired donors, with O as oxidant and incorporation or reduction of oxygen. The oxygen incorporated need not be derived from O with NADH or NADPH as one donor, and the other dehydrogenated. The systematic name of this enzyme class is (S)-tetrahydrocolumbamine,NADPH:oxygen oxidoreductase (methylenedioxy-bridge-forming). Other names in common use include (S)-tetrahydroberberine synthase, and (S)-tetrahydrocolumbamine oxidase (methylenedioxy-bridge-forming). This enzyme participates in alkaloid biosynthesis i. It employs one cofactor, heme-thiolate(P-450).

References

 

EC 1.14.21
NADPH-dependent enzymes
Heme enzymes
Enzymes of unknown structure